Jacques Sigurd (15 June 1920, Paris – 21 December 1987, New York City) was a French screenwriter.

Selected filmography
 All Roads Lead to Rome (1949)
 Leathernose (1952)
 The Lovers of Midnight (1953)
 The Lovers of Manon Lescaut (1954)
 The Beautiful Otero (1954)
 The Air of Paris (1954)

References

External links

1920 births
1987 deaths
French male screenwriters
20th-century French screenwriters
20th-century French male writers
French expatriates in the United States